Jesus of Cool is the solo debut album by British singer-songwriter Nick Lowe. Produced by Lowe, it was released in March 1978 by Radar Records in the UK.

In the United States, the album was reconfigured by Columbia Records and retitled Pure Pop for Now People, a slogan that had appeared on the original UK album cover, with Columbia opting for a different track listing: "Shake and Pop" was replaced with "They Called It Rock," a slightly different version of the song by Lowe's other band Rockpile, which had been included as a single-sided bonus 45 in the original UK album; the live version of "Heart of the City" was replaced with a studio version that had been released as the b-side of Lowe's "So It Goes" single on Stiff Records; and "Rollers Show," a song originally released by Lowe in 1977 as a United Artists novelty single under the name Tartan Horde (a follow-up to their single "Bay City Rollers We Love You"), was added. The songs are also in a different order than the UK version.

Jesus of Cool has been highly acclaimed by critics. In February 2008, it was reissued in an expanded, deluxe edition by Proper Records in the UK and Yep Roc Records in the US. On April 23, 2022, for Record Store Day, the album was rereleased again under the name Wireless World, combining the track lists of Jesus of Cool and Pure Pop for Now People into one album.

Two verses of the song "So It Goes" were featured in the 1979 film Rock 'n' Roll High School.

Themes
Jesus of Cool has a number of tracks attacking the commercialism and greed of the record industry and the shallow content of pop music: "Music for Money," the fraternal twin songs "Shake and Pop" and "They Called It Rock," and "Rollers Show," the last being a parody of the teen audience of the Bay City Rollers. Although musically sophisticated in conventional genres, the album shares the energy, cynicism and rebelliousness of the contemporary new wave movement.

Album cover
The original vinyl album cover features six pictures of Nick Lowe. The UK, US and Scandinavian versions featuring a slightly different selection of photos. On both covers, the phrase "PURE POP FOR NOW PEOPLE" is spelled out in small letters across the photos. "PURE" was small yellow print in the top left photo, "POP" was small red print in the top middle, "FOR" was small blue print in the top right, "NOW" was small blue print bottom left, "PEO" was small yellow print in the bottom middle and "PLE" was small red print in the bottom right.

The UK version had a photo of three kitsch glass swan ornaments on the back sleeve. The US version replaced this with a picture of Lowe dressed up in a green Riddler suit made by Antoinette Laumer Sales. The design of the inner sleeve also differs between the UK and US versions.

The UK, US and Scandinavian sleeves were designed by Barney Bubbles.

Critical reception 

Reviewing the American release in 1978, Village Voice critic Robert Christgau called it "an amazing pop tour-de-force demonstrating that if the music is cute enough the words can be any old non-cliché". The characters in Lowe's songs, he observed, "cut off their right arms, castrate Castro, love the sound of breaking glass, roam with alligators in the heart of the city, and go to see the Bay City Rollers. But because the hooks cascade so deftly from sources as diverse as the Beach Boys and the Boomtown Rats, I care about every one of them."

Peter Silverton of Sounds said at the time of release, "Despite the track to track differences in sound, they're all so very Lowe – sparse, carefully selected instrumentation, delicacy of touch and understated vocals. But when he turns in masterpieces like 'Marie Provost' – certainly the best, most fully formed lyrics he's ever written – you forget the partial failures."

Nick Kent, writing in NME, noted that fans of Lowe would be "more than a little pissed off" by the inclusion of five songs that had previously been released in different formats, but also said, "if you're not already familiar with these titles then you at least have nothing to complain about, seeing that they're almost uniformly superb."

Track listing

All songs written by Nick Lowe, except where otherwise noted.

Jesus of Cool

 "They Called It Rock" was a single-sided, non-album 45, credited to the band Rockpile.
 "Rollers Show" and "They Called It Rock," both of which were included on the US issue of Pure Pop for Now People, were added as bonus tracks to the first UK CD release of this album in 1989.

Pure Pop for Now People

 "Heart of the City" is the studio version.

Jesus of Cool (2008 deluxe edition)

 "Cruel to Be Kind" is the original version by Brinsley Schwarz, recorded for their unreleased album It's All Over Now and first released as the B-side to Lowe's "Little Hitler" single in 1978.

Wireless World (2022 Record Store Day release)

Personnel
Upon the album's initial release, the cover artwork deliberately omitted any mention of the musicians involved.

Nick Lowe – vocals, bass, guitars, piano
Billy Bremner – guitars
Dave Edmunds – guitars, vocals
John Turnbull – lead guitar on "Nutted by Reality"
John McFee – guitar solo on "Tonight"
Martin Belmont - guitar
Andrew Bodnar – bass
Norman Watt-Roy – bass on "Nutted by Reality"
Terry Williams – drums
Steve Goulding – drums
Pete Thomas – drums
Charley Charles – drums on "Nutted by Reality"
Bob Andrews – piano, organ
Steve Nieve – piano on "Nutted by Reality"
Roger Béchirian – tambourine and backing vocals on "I Love The Sound Of Breaking Glass", organ on "Marie Provost"

Charts

Related links
"Marie Provost" guitar tabs and lyrics
Marie Prevost

References

External links
 

1978 debut albums
Nick Lowe albums
Albums produced by Nick Lowe
Radar Records albums
F-Beat Records albums
Columbia Records albums
Yep Roc Records albums
Proper Records albums